Graham Cooper may refer to:

 Graham Cooper (footballer, born 1962), English football midfielder for Huddersfield Town
 Graham Cooper (Australian rules footballer) (1938–2019), Australian rules footballer for Hawthorn
 Graham Cooper (cricketer) (1936–2012), English cricketer
 Graham Cooper (rower) (born 1941), British Olympic rower
 Graham Cooper (referee) (born 1989), Australian rugby union referee